John E. Spiegel was an American football player, coach of football and basketball, and college athletics administrator.  A native of Detroit, Michigan, Spiegel played at the halfback position for Washington & Jefferson College from 1913 to 1914.  He was selected as a second-team All-American in 1913 and was the leading scorer in college football.  In 1914, he was a consensus first-team All-American.  From 1915 to 1916, Spiegel was the football coach, basketball coach, and athletic director at the University of Chattanooga.  After World War I, Spiegel coached at Muhlenberg College from 1921 to 1922.

Head coaching record

Football

References

Year of birth missing
Year of death missing
American football halfbacks
Basketball coaches from Michigan
Chattanooga Mocs athletic directors
Chattanooga Mocs men's basketball coaches
Chattanooga Mocs football coaches
Lafayette Leopards football players
Muhlenberg Mules football coaches
Washington & Jefferson Presidents football players
All-American college football players
Sportspeople from Detroit
Players of American football from Detroit